The Niohuru (in Manchu) were a prominent Manchu clan during the Qing dynasty. The clan had inhabited the Changbai Mountains since as early as the Liao dynasty. The clan was well known during the Qing dynasty for producing a variety of consorts of all ranks for emperors, several of whom went on to become mothers to reigning emperors. Prominent people who belonged or trace heritage to the Niohuru clan including famed Manchu warrior Eidu, his son the high official Ebilun, the Empress Dowager Ci'an, the infamous corrupt official Heshen, the contemporary concert pianist Lang Lang and Lang Tsuyun (Ann Lang), Taiwanese TV, movie and stage actress, singer and producer

Distribution 

Written records of the Niohuru clan dates back to the Liao dynasty (907–1125), when it was known as the Dilie clan (敌烈氏) by Chinese transliteration. The current transliteration Niohuru came into being during the Ming dynasty. The Niohuru clan inhabited the Changbai mountains region of present-day Jilin province in northeast China (otherwise known as "Manchuria"), and also on the banks of the Songhua River and Mudan River.

According to members of the clan who attempted to re-trace their genealogy, the common primogenitor of the vast tribe date back to one Sohoji Bayan (honorific Su Gung), who was six generations removed from Eidu, the first eminent Niohuru clan member in recorded Qing history. The Niohuru were widely distributed throughout the territory of the Manchu empire, and each of the Eight Banners had some Niohurus among their ranks.

Towards the end of the Qing dynasty and particularly after the founding the Republic of China in 1912, many Manchus adopted single-character Chinese surnames based on their clan origin. The Niohuru were known to have adopted to two versions, "Niu" (钮), which could be found in the modern province of Jiangxi in addition to Manchuria; and "Lang" (朗). Lang sounded like "wolf" in Chinese (狼), roughly corresponding to the Manchu root word Niohe for Niohuru meaning "wolf".

Niu 钮 is on the Hundred Family Surnames poem.

Notable figures

Males
 Eidu (1562–1621), Manchu noble, close associate of Nurhaci
 Daqi, Eidu's second son
 Turgei (1594–1645), Eidu's eighth son; officer of Manchu armies during the reign of Hong Taiji
 Ebilun (d. 1673), Eidu's 16th son by Mukushen; served as one of the Four Regents of the Kangxi Emperor
 Necin (d. 1749), Ebilun's grandson; Manchu overseer of the Board of War during the Qianlong era
 Alingga (1670–1716), Ebilun's seventh son; official at the court of the Kangxi Emperor
 Heshen (1750–1799), infamous official of the late Qianlong era
 Fengšeninde (1775–1810), Heshen's first son
Mukedengbu (穆克登布; d. 1803),grandfather of Empress Xiaoquancheng
Yiling (頤齡/颐龄), served as a first rank military official (駐防將軍/驻防将军，pinyin:zhufangjiangjun) in Suzhou, and held the title of a third class duke (三等公)
 Sihung Lung (1930–2002), Taiwan actor
 Niu Maosheng (born 1939), Governor of Hebei
 Larry Hsien Ping Lang (born 1956), Hong Kong economist
 Doze Niu (born 1966), Taiwan director
 Lang Lang (born 1982), internationally renowned concert pianist

 Prince Consort

Females
Imperial Consort
 Empress
 Empress Xiaozhaoren (1659–1678), the Kangxi Emperor's second empress
 Empress Xiaoshengxian (1692–1777), the Yongzheng Emperor's noble consort, the mother of the Qianlong Emperor (1711–1799)
 Empress Xiaoherui (1776–1850), the Jiaqing Emperor's second empress, the mother of seventh daughter (1793–1795), Miankai (1795–1838) and Mianxin (1805–1828)
 Empress Xiaomucheng (1781–1808), the Daoguang Emperor's first primary consort
 Empress Xiaoquancheng (1808–1840), the Daoguang Emperor's second empress, the mother of Princess Duanshun (1825–1835), Princess Shou'an (1826–1860) and the Xianfeng Emperor (1831–1861)
 Empress Xiaozhenxian (1837–1881), the Xianfeng Emperor's empress

 Imperial Noble Consort
 Imperial Noble Consort Gongshun (1787–1860), the Jiaqing Emperor's consort, the mother of eighth daughter (1805–1806), Princess Huimin (1811–1815) and Mianyu (1814–1865)

 Noble Consort
 Noble Consort Wenxi (1661–1694), the Kangxi Emperor's noble consort, the mother of Yun'e (1683–1741) and 11th daughter (1685–1686)
 Noble Consort Cheng (1813–1888), the Daoguang Emperor's noble lady

 Consort
 Consort Xiang (1808–1861), the Daoguang Emperor's noble lady, the mother of second daughter (1825), Princess Shouzang (1829–1856) and Yicong (1831–1889)

 Imperial Concubine
 Imperial Concubine Cheng (d. 1784), the Qianlong Emperor's imperial concubine

 Noble Lady
 Noble Lady Shun (1749–1780), the Qianlong Emperor's noble lady

Princess Consort
 Primary Consort
 Hong Taiji's first primary consort (1593–1612), the mother of Lobohoi (1611–1617)
 Yunli's primary consort
 Yongrong's second primary consort, the mother of Mianxin (1775–1777), Princess (b. 1776) and Mianqing (1779–1804)
 Yonglin's first primary consort (d. 1801), the mother of Mianheng (1790), second son (1793–1795) and second daughter (1796–1801)
 Miankai's primary consort, the mother of Yizuan (1818–1821)
 Yihe's primary consort (d. 1871)

 Secondary Consort
 Yunbi's secondary consort, the mother of Lady (b. 1738) and Hongkang (1747–1814)

 Concubine
 Nurhaci's concubine, the mother of Tanggūdai (1585–1640) and Tabai (1589–1639)
 The Kangxi Emperor's concubine, the mother of 20th daughter (1708 – 1708 or 1709)
 Changning's concubine, the mother of sixth daughter (1684–1712)

 Lang Tsuyun 郎祖筠, Taiwanese entertainment personality, famous for TV, movie and stage acting, singer, writer and producer.

Gallery

See also 
List of Manchu clans

References 

Materials for a Genealogy of the Niohuru Clan: With Introductory Remarks on Manchu Onomastics

Manchu clans
 
Bordered Yellow Banner
Plain Red Banner